Mijuško Bojović (born 9 August 1988) is a Montenegrin footballer who plays as a defender for Inđija in the Serbian First League.

Club statistics

Updated to games played as of 19 May 2019.

References

External links

1988 births
Living people
Sportspeople from Pljevlja
Association football central defenders
Montenegrin footballers
Montenegro under-21 international footballers
FK Rudar Pljevlja players
R. Charleroi S.C. players
S.K. Beveren players
Enosis Neon Paralimni FC players
Gyirmót FC Győr players
Újpest FC players
Shamakhi FK players
Montenegrin First League players
Belgian Pro League players
Cypriot First Division players
Nemzeti Bajnokság I players
Azerbaijan Premier League players
Montenegrin expatriate footballers
Expatriate footballers in Belgium
Expatriate footballers in Cyprus
Expatriate footballers in Hungary
Expatriate footballers in Azerbaijan
Montenegrin expatriate sportspeople in Belgium
Montenegrin expatriate sportspeople in Cyprus
Montenegrin expatriate sportspeople in Hungary
Montenegrin expatriate sportspeople in Azerbaijan